Laff Records was a small American independent record label specializing in comedy and party records originating on the West Coast of the United States during the 1970s. Amongst their artists were Richard Pryor, Redd Foxx, LaWanda Page, George Carlin, black ventriloquist duo Richard And Willie, Kip Addotta, Belle Barth, Rex Benson, and Skillet & Leroy.

Releases on Laff were notorious for their raunchy content on both the record and its album jacket. Many of these titles have had to be denoted with an "Adults Only" warning on the front cover and sold under the counter, decades before the infamous Parental Advisory sticker was a fixture on album covers. Many Laff album covers featured topless models. Laff also became notorious both for the questionable quality of its record pressings and for its frequent repackaging of previously released titles with new titles and artwork.  Pryor's vast quantity of releases issued by Laff is a case in point. Pryor released only one album for Laff, Craps (After Hours), with his direct participation and then later signed a deal with the larger Stax label. Laff sued Pryor after Stax released That Nigger's Crazy in 1974; the case was settled when Laff gave Pryor his freedom in exchange for being allowed to compile albums from recordings it made with Pryor between 1969 and 1973.

Laff went out of business sometime in the 1980s, with their last "hit" recording being Kip Addotta's "Wet Dream" (a favorite of fans of the Dr. Demento radio show), but many of their more profitable recordings still circulated through other labels for some time afterward. In 1993, Island Records briefly re-released Foxx and Pryor titles on cassette and compact disc that had been originally issued by Laff, including Pryor's Craps (After Hours). These releases disappeared from store shelves after Island's parent company PolyGram was absorbed by Universal Music.

In 2002 Richard Pryor and his wife/manager, Jennifer Lee Pryor, purchased the rights to all of Richard's Laff masters and raw tapes from San Juan Music, the successor in interest to Laff Records. The Pryors then gave free rein to Rhino Records to go through the tapes and make an anthology that included the entire Craps (After Hours) album and the best of other Laff releases. The results were released in 2005 on the 2-CD set Evolution/Revolution: The Early Years (1966–1974).

Some of the remaining Laff masters have been reissued by Uproar Entertainment.

Note that there were several earlier, unrelated companies that issued 78 RPM discs under the name Laff Records in the late 1940s. Of these, one was based in New York, a second was allegedly from Chicago, and a third released titles under the name Laff-Disc (later abbreviated to L D). All were probably defunct long before the Los Angeles label began operations.

See also
 List of record labels

References

External links
 Laff Records Illustrated Discography at rassoodock.com
 Uproar Entertainment

American independent record labels
Defunct record labels of the United States
Comedy record labels
1970s in comedy